H2 (or History2) is a brand name owned by A&E Networks (a joint venture between the Hearst Communications and the Walt Disney Television division of The Walt Disney Company), used for a sister television channel of History. The brand was debuted in September 2011 when History International in the United States was relaunched as H2. The brand was expanded outside the U.S. since then. H2 in the United States was relaunched on February 29, 2016 as Viceland, but the H2 brand is still used for sister channels to History in other markets.

A&E Networks began rebranding the remaining versions of H2 as History2, starting with Latin American version on January 1, 2019.

On November 6, 2018, concerning Disney's proposed acquisition of 21st Century Fox, the European Commission required Disney to sell A&E's television operations in Europe, which include the versions of H2 in the area.

Versions

North America

The H2 brand was introduced in the United States, when History International was re-branded as such on September 26, 2011, with its programming being refocused to feature documentary content from its sister network History prior to that network's shift towards more reality programming. The American channel was later replaced by Viceland on February 29, 2016.

On August 27, 2012, Shaw Media, relaunched the male-focused Category A digital channel The Cave as a domestic Canadian version of H2.

Latin America
In 2014, a Latin American version of H2 was launched under the ownership of A+E Networks Latin America (a joint venture between A+E Networks and Ole Communications) and distributed by Ole Distribution. On January 1, 2019, H2 was re-branded as History2.

Europe
Croatia: The Croatian version of H2 was launched on 1 February 2018 on Hrvatski Telekom's MaxTV.
Poland: The Polish version of H2 was launched on 28 October 2014. On 6 February 2019, the channel was rebranded as History2.
Serbia: On 12 April 2015, the Serbian version of H2 was launched to Orion TV customers. It was also made available to MTS TV customers in May of that year.
United Kingdom and Ireland: On 4 May 2013, the local version of Military History was re-branded as H2. It launched on TalkTalk on August 28, 2014 and a few months later on BT TV. An HD version launched on Virgin Media on 1 December 2015, and later on BT TV in October 2016. On February 6, 2019, this version was then re-branded again as History2. On May 27, 2020, to coincide with the launches of Sky Documentaries and Sky Nature, History and History2 rebranded to Sky History and Sky History2, respectively, in the UK and Ireland.

MENA
In the Middle East and North Africa, the regional version of H2 is available on OSN since 1 February 2016.

Asia
In Southeast Asia, A+E Networks launched a regional version of H2 on 14 June 2013. After 9 years of broadcasting, H2 Asia was ceased broadcasting on 1 October 2022.

See also
 List of programs broadcast by History (TV channel)

References

A&E Networks
Television channels in North Macedonia